Juan Roberto Redon (born 26 November 1950) is a Mexican equestrian. He competed at the 1976 Summer Olympics and the 1984 Summer Olympics.

References

1950 births
Living people
Mexican male equestrians
Olympic equestrians of Mexico
Equestrians at the 1976 Summer Olympics
Equestrians at the 1984 Summer Olympics
Place of birth missing (living people)